Foluso Olugbenga Babatunji is an Anglican bishop in Nigeria:

Babatunji was born on 27 May 1968  in Osun State. He was educated at Ijebu-jesa Grammar School, Immanuel College of Theology, Ibadan
He was ordained in 1991. He has served in four Dioceses. Babatunji later became an Archdeacon.  In 2019 he succeeded James Afolabi Popoola as Bishop of Osun.

Notes

21st-century Anglican bishops in Nigeria
People from Osun State
1968 births
Anglican bishops of Osun
University of Ibadan alumni
Living people
Church of Nigeria archdeacons